Lama is a pop/rock band based in Ukraine. It became popular after release of their first singles: "Meni tak treba" (I Need So) and "Moje sertse" (My Heart). Their third single was "Litak" (Airplane). Lama's first album Meni tak treba was released in autumn 2006. The active members of Lama are Natalia Dzenkiv (vocals, lyrics), Andriy Aleksyeyev  (guitar), Zurab Rogava (bass guitar) and Dmytro Suprunyuk (drums). In 2007 Lama got the Best Ukrainian act award of MTV Europe Music Awards.

Dzeňkiv has stated in interview that she is planning to record songs in English, and has no plans to sing in Russian.

Discography 
The discography includes 3 studio albums, 15 singles, 1 compilation album and 18 music videos.

Albums
2006: Meni tak treba (Мені так треба)
2008: Svitlo i tiň (Світло і тінь)
2013: Nazavzhdy (Назавжди)

Singles
 2006: Meni tak treba (Мені так треба)
 2006: Moje sertse (Моє серце)
 2006: Litak (Літак)
 2007: Z tym, koho ľubyla (З тим, кого любила)
 2007: Svitlo i tiň (Світло і тінь)
 2008: Znayesh, jak bolyť (Знаєш, як болить) #1
 2008: Ne Mama (Не мама) #3
 2009: Ja ne ta (Я не та) #2
 2009: Z dzherela (З джерела) #3
 2009: Zhovte pole (Жовте поле)
 2010: Trymay (Тримай) #2
 2019: Dym (Дим)

Compilations
2010: Trymay (Тримай)

Soundtracks
 2008: Znayesh, jak bolyť (Знаєш, як болить) featuring the movie Sappho

Music videos
2000-s

2010-s

References

External links
Official web site

Ukrainian musical groups
MTV Europe Music Award winners